The Moonlight Sonata is a 1988 Finnish horror comedy film directed by Olli Soinio. The film won two Jussi Awards in 1989: Kari Sorvali for best male lead, and Matti Kuortti and Paul Jyrälä for best recording. The film was also nominated for Best Picture at the 1990 International Fantasy Film Award Festival.

The more comedic sequel to the film, Moonlight Sonata II: The Street Sweepers, was completed in 1991 and is also directed and written by Olli Soinio.

Premise 
A female fashion model Anni Stark (Tiina Björkman) takes leave from the fashion business and goes to Lapland for a vacation. Little does she know that there's a totally lunatic bunch of local hillbillies living in a nearby farmhouse. The plot thickens as one of the residents begins to harass Anni, who is left alone in the wilderness with only her dog to protect her.

Cast 
 Tiina Björkman - Anni Stark
  - Arvo Ilmari Johannes Kyyrölä
 Kim Gunell - Johannes
  - Sulo Kyyrölä
 Ville-Veikko Salminen - Carli
  - Äite Kyyrölä
  - Motellin isäntä
  - Kauppias

References

External links 

1980s comedy horror films
Finnish comedy horror films
1988 comedy films
1988 horror films
1988 films
1980s Finnish-language films